SS Edward W. Bok was a Liberty ship built in the United States during World War II. She was named after Edward W. Bok, a naval constructor a Dutch-born American editor and Pulitzer Prize-winning author. He was editor of the Ladies' Home Journal for 30 years (1889-1919) and created Bok Tower Gardens in central Florida.

Construction
Edward W. Bok was laid down on 14 January 1944, under a Maritime Commission (MARCOM) contract, MC hull 2469, by the St. Johns River Shipbuilding Company, Jacksonville, Florida; she was sponsored by Mrs. H.M. Nornabell, the wife of Major Henry Marshall Nornabell, the director of Bok Tower Gardens, and was launched on 12 March 1944.

History
She was allocated to the Luckenbach Steamship Company, on 27 March 1944. On 18 May 1946, she was laid up in the National Defense Reserve Fleet, Wilmington, North Carolina. She was sold for commercial use, 4 January 1947, to Italy, for $544,506. She was removed from the fleet on 16 January 1947. Edward W. Bok was renamed Paolina and flagged in Italy. She was renamed Nando in 1959. In 1960, she was sold and renamed Kim and flagged in Panama. In 1965, she was sold and renamed Sun. She was scrapped in Japan, in 1970.

References

Bibliography

 
 
 
 

 

Liberty ships
Ships built in Jacksonville, Florida
1944 ships
Wilmington Reserve Fleet
Liberty ships transferred to Italy